Peter Preiser is chair of the School of Biological Sciences and a professor of molecular genetics and cell biology at the Nanyang Technological University (NTU) in Singapore. He specialises in the study of the malaria parasite and is head of the team at NTU that has discovered a route to a possible vaccine for the disease.

References

External links

Academic staff of Nanyang Technological University
University of Delaware alumni
Malaria
Living people
Year of birth missing (living people)